Alope was a town of Opuntian Locris on the coast between Daphnus (modern Agios Konstantinos) and Cynus (modern Livanates). Its ruins have been discovered by William Gell on an isolated hill near the shore in the modern village of Melidoni, Phthiotis (Greek: Μελιδόνι Φθιώτιδας).

History
Concerning the history of the city, the Locrians were defeated by the Athenians under Kleopompos in 431 BCE nearby, and the city was taken. It suffered greatly from the terrible earthquake of 426 BCE, according to Demetrius Callatianus quoted by Strabo.

References

Populated places in Opuntian Locris
Cities in ancient Greece
Former populated places in Greece